West Fork Mojave River is a tributary stream of the Mojave River in the San Bernardino Mountains of San Bernardino County, California. Sawpit Canyon Creek and East Fork of West Fork Mojave River are its tributaries, both of which now feed into Silverwood Lake that was created when the West Fork was obstructed by the Cedar Springs Dam in 1971.

History

The Mohave Trail from the Colorado River crossed the Mojave Desert, then followed the Mojave River, and West Fork Mojave River up to Sawpit Canyon and up it to cross the San Bernardino Mountains at Monument Peak to the coastal plains of Southern California.

References

West Fork Mojave River
West Fork Mojave River
West Fork Mojave River
Rivers of Southern California
Mohave Trail